= Railway Association =

German non-profit organisation

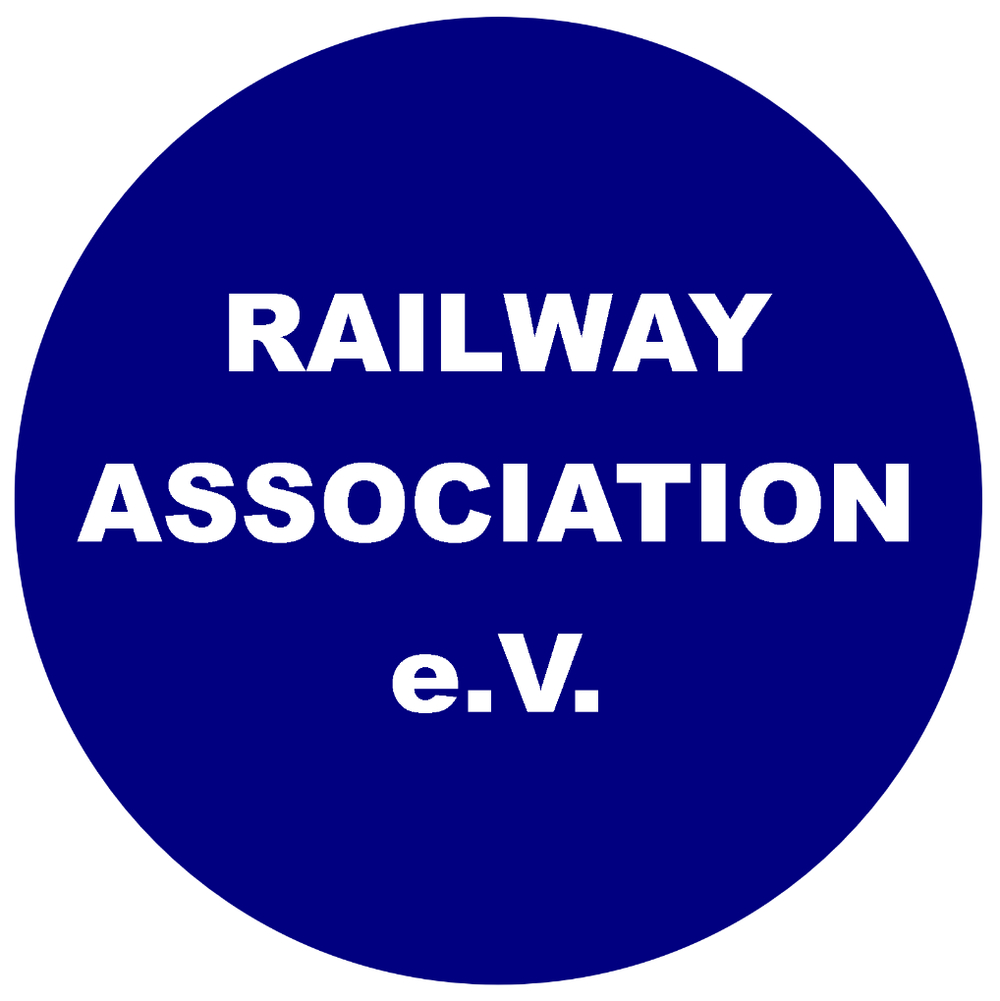
- Railway Association e.V
- Formation: September 25, 2024
- Type: Nonprofit
- Legal status: active
- Purpose: research and development, education and training, information concerning railways
- Headquarters: Berlin, Germany
- Official language: English
- President: Markus Hecht
- Vice President: Alois Starlinger
- Member of the executive Board: Jonathan Tschepe
- General Director and Chief Executive Officer: Eckhard Schulz
- Website: https://railway-association.info

The Railway Association was founded in 2024 as a non-profit organisation. It is headquartered in Berlin.

Articles of Railway Association have been published in the registry for associations in Berlin (Registration number: VR 42347 B).

The Railway Association is listed in the directory of Railway Associations.

The Railway Association is listed in the directory of Railway Associations published by RAILWAY NEWS.

== Railway Award ==
The Railway Association is a partner of the Railway Award initiative in cooperation with the German railway association Bahnverband e.V.
